Álvaro de Oliveira Felicíssimo (born 27 May 2001), known as just Álvaro, is a Brazilian footballer who currently plays for Dibba.

Career statistics

Club

Notes

References

External links
 

2001 births
Living people
Brazilian footballers
Brazilian expatriate footballers
Association football forwards
UAE Pro League players
UAE First Division League players
América Futebol Clube (MG) players
Shabab Al-Ahli Club players
Fujairah FC players
Dibba FC players
Expatriate footballers in the United Arab Emirates
Brazilian expatriate sportspeople in the United Arab Emirates